Jeff Likens (born August 28, 1985 in Barrington, Illinois) is an American former professional ice hockey defenseman who played most notably in the Deutsche Eishockey Liga (DEL).

Playing career
After spending two years playing for the US National Development Team Program, Likens spent four years playing for the University of Wisconsin–Madison before turning pro in 2007 with the American Hockey League's Manchester Monarchs.  He also had a spell in the ECHL with the Reading Royals.  In 2008, Likens moved to Germany and signed for Augsburger Panther. After two seasons, Liken left the Panthers and signed a one-year contract on April 12, 2010, for the Thomas Sabo Ice Tigers.

On April 8, 2011, Likens left the Ice Tigers after one season and joined ERC Ingolstadt on a one-year deal. After completing the 2012–13 season, his second with Ingolstadt, Likens was out of contract and signed a one-year deal with fellow DEL club, EHC Wolfsburg on April 17, 2013.

Career statistics

Regular season and playoffs

International

References

External links

1985 births
American men's ice hockey defensemen
Augsburger Panther players
ERC Ingolstadt players
Ice hockey players from Illinois
Living people
Manchester Monarchs (AHL) players
Nürnberg Ice Tigers players
Reading Royals players
Wisconsin Badgers men's ice hockey players
Grizzlys Wolfsburg players